The Israel B. Mason House is an historic house at 571 Broad Street in Providence, Rhode Island.  It is a -story wood-frame structure, built in 1888 for Israel Bowen Mason, a wealthy merchant.  It is one of the city's finest Queen Anne residences, with a visually complex assortment of projecting bays, verandas, turrets and gables.  Particularly of note are its eastern porch and three-story octagonal tower.  The house was designed by Stone, Carpenter & Willson, a prominent local architecture firm, for Mason, a self-made successful wholesaler of grocery and meat products.  The house now houses a funeral home.

The house was listed on the National Register of Historic Places in 1977.

See also
National Register of Historic Places listings in Providence, Rhode Island

References

Houses on the National Register of Historic Places in Rhode Island
Houses in Providence, Rhode Island
National Register of Historic Places in Providence, Rhode Island
Houses completed in 1888
Queen Anne architecture in Rhode Island